Malacosoma alpicolum (also, M. alpicola) is a moth of the family Lasiocampidae, the snout moths. It is native to the southern and central Alps.

The wingspan is 18–34 mm. The moth flies from July to August.

The larvae feed on various plants, including roses, common blackberry, Alchemilla alpina, Potentilla aurea, Filipendula ulmaria, and Euphorbia cyparissias.

Subspecies
Malacosoma alpicolum alpicolum
Malacosoma alpicolum mixtum (Morocco)Rothschild, 1925

External links

 Moths and Butterflies of Europe and North Africa
 www.lepiforum.de
 www.schmetterling-raupe.de

Malacosoma
Moths of Europe
Moths of Asia
Moths described in 1870
Taxa named by Otto Staudinger